The 2001–02 season of the División de Honor de Futsal is the 13th season of top-tier futsal in Spain.

Regular season

League table

Playoffs

Goalscorers

As day 30 of 30

See also
División de Honor de Futsal
Futsal in Spain

External links
2001–02 season at lnfs.es

2001 02
Spain
futsal